Jat'u K'achi (Aymara jat'u the stripes on a blanket, k'achi incisors; chin; vertex, edge, possibly "stripe incisors", Hispanicized spelling Jatucachi) is a  mountain in the Andes of southern Peru, about  high. It is located on the border of the Moquegua Region, General Sánchez Cerro Province, Ichuña District, and the Puno Region, Puno Province, San Antonio District. Jat'u K'achi lies west of the mountain Chuqipata, northeast of Millu and southeast of Pura Purani.

References

Mountains of Moquegua Region
Mountains of Puno Region
Mountains of Peru